Acrocercops brochogramma is a moth of the family Gracillariidae, known from Guadalcanal Island in the Solomon Islands, as well as India and Sri Lanka. The hostplant for the species is an unidentified species of Hibiscus.

References

brochogramma
Moths of Oceania
Moths of Asia
Moths described in 1914